The  is a Japanese thoroughbred horse race run on dirt track for four years old and above. It is run over a distance of 1,600 meters (about 8 furlongs) at Funabashi Racecourse during the period known as Golden Week from the end of April to the beginning of May.

The race began as a non grade race in 1978, when its distance was 1,800 meters. In 1997, it was graded Domestic Grade 3. And in 2002, it was elevated to Domestic Grade 2. Finally, after three years, it was graded Domestic Grade 1 race. It is considered "the dirt mile championship in spring".

The top two finishers will be granted a participation right in Teio sho, if they are not coming from Japan Racing Association(JRA).

Records
Most successful horses (3 wins):
 Espoir City – 2009, 2010, 2012

Winners since 2000

References

Open middle distance horse races
Horse races in Japan